The 2020 Football Championship of Poltava Oblast was won by Olimpiya Savyntsi.

League table

References

Football
Poltava
Poltava